Blackfin may refer to:
 Blackfin, a family of embedded DSP microprocessors.
 Blackfin cisco, member of the whitefish sub-family.
 Black fin conger, an eel in the family Congridae.
 Blackfin snake eel, or "highfin snake eel" of the family Ophichtidae.
 Blackfin tuna, the smallest tuna species.
 Black-finned anemonefish, of the family Pomacentridae.
 Blue black-finned chub, a species of parrotfish.

See also
 The Black Fins, New Zealand national surf life saving team.